The 2020–21 Robert Morris Colonials men's basketball team represented Robert Morris University during the 2020–21 NCAA Division I men's basketball season. The Colonials, led by 11th-year head coach Andrew Toole, played their home games at the UPMC Events Center in Moon Township, Pennsylvania as first-year members of the Horizon League.

Previous season
The Colonials finished the 2019–20 season 20–14, 13–5 in NEC play to finish in a tie for second place. They defeated St. Francis Brooklyn, LIU and Saint Francis (PA) to be champions of the NEC tournament. They earned the NEC's automatic bid to the NCAA tournament. However, the NCAA Tournament was cancelled amid the COVID-19 pandemic.

It was the last season for the Colonials in the NEC.

Roster

Schedule and results

|-
!colspan=12 style=| Non-conference regular season

|-
!colspan=12 style=| Horizon League tournament
|-

Source

References

Robert Morris Colonials men's basketball seasons
Robert Morris
Robert Morris Colonials men's basketball team
Robert Morris Colonials men's basketball team